Mesalges hirsutus  is an  acarid feather mite. It is a parasite of birds including several parrot species and the Mascarene martin of Madagascar.

References

Sarcoptiformes
Parasites of birds
Arthropods of Madagascar